My Stupid Boss is a 2016 Indonesian comedy film directed and written by Upi Avianto based on a four-part novel series of the same name by Chaos@Work. The film stars Reza Rahadian, Bunga Citra Lestari, Alex Abbad, Chew Kin Wah, Atikah Suhaime and Bront Palarae as workers of a company led by a stupid and weird boss known simply as "Bossman". The film was released simultaneously in Indonesia, Malaysia, Singapore and Brunei on 19 May 2016 by Falcon Pictures and Metrowealth Movies Production.

Plot 
Indonesians Diana and Dika, the latter of whom has a characteristically lazy personality, live at a Kuala Lumpur apartment. Bored of constantly staying home, "Bossman", Dika's friend whom he first met when studying in California, offers Diana a job as an administrator. On the day of the interview, Diana is surprised by how many people dislike Bossman, and she later comes to dislike him too. Bossman is widely seen as gibberish, entitled, weird, and irritating. Though rich, Bossman refuses to manage the office's crippling structure and broken air conditioner.

As Bossman's stupidity worsens in her eyes, Diana contemplates resigning and even murdering him with a Molotov bomb. Dika constantly reassures her "Dia memang begitu", meaning "That's the way he is", further irritating Diana. To take revenge on him, Diana and the four main workers (Norah Sikin, Mr. Kho, Azhari, and Adrian) disturb Bossman in a variety of ways, from calling him while he is asleep, to calling in the landlord. In the latter, as Bossman flees via a secret door, all employees dance in freedom.

However the joy only lasts for short, and Diana's contemplation become more robust. Dika encourages her to declare resignation respectfully. As she is about to, however, Bossman brings her on a ride to an orphanage. Bossman explains that one day, he saw a boy who brought his laptop to him when he forgot. He secretly follows the boy, who is a member of the orphanage, helping a blind peer walk to the decaying building. He expresses willingness to upgrade the orphanage to a more lively one. Bossman's kindness reminds Diana and the workers that there is good in everyone.

As Bossman's birthday arrives, he decides to treat everyone for lunch. However, as afternoon strikes and everyone reminds him of it, Bossman denies and commands everyone to work, raging them.

Production
My Stupid Boss was adapted to screenplay from a story written by Chaos@work. Upi Avianto wrote screenplay from the original version for a duration of 6 months and directed the film. The film was released on 19 May 2016 by Falcon Pictures in Indonesia, Malaysia, Singapore, and Brunei.

Cast
 Reza Rahadian as Bossman
 Bunga Citra Lestari as Diana
 Alex Abbad as Dika
 Bront Palarae as Adrian
 Chew Kin Wah as Mr. Kho
 Atikah Suhaime as Norasikin
 Iskandar Zulkarnain as Azhari
 Melissa Karim as Bossman's Wife
 Nadiya Nisaa as Siti
 Sharmaine Othman as Vivian
 Sherry Alhadad as Azizah
 Richard Oh as Mr. Chia
 Ting Tan as Pipe Shop Boss

Reception
On the 15th day after release, My Stupid Boss reached 2,298,000 viewers. On 5 July 2016, The Jakarta Post published a list of "5 most watched movies from the last decade" created by filmindonesia.or.id that includes My Stupid Boss.

References

External links
 
 My Stupid Boss at Layar Film
 Falcon Pictures website

2016 films
2010s Indonesian-language films
Malay-language films
Indonesian multilingual films
2016 multilingual films